Arthur Atkins (1873, Queens Ferry, England - 1899, Piedmont, California) was an American tonalist landscape painter. He emigrated to San Francisco at the age of 19. He was essentially self-taught, but studied briefly at the San Francisco School of Design. His paintings were shown at the Vickery, Atkins & Torrey gallery and at his Jackson Street studio, both in San Francisco, and his paintings sold well. His brother, Henry Atkins and his uncle, William Kingston Vickery were co-founders of the Vickery, Atkins & Torrey art gallery.

Between 1897 and August 1898, Atkins visited England and France and studied art in Paris. He was mostly influenced by the paintings of Édouard Manet and James McNeill Whistler while in Europe.

Atkins' favorite landscape subject were the rolling hills near Piedmont, across the bay from San Francisco. Atkins' works are very rare due to a fire at his San Francisco studio in the 1890s and further losses in the 1906 San Francisco earthquake and fire.

A book of Atkins' notes and letters, from his visit to Europe, by A. M. Robertson and Bruce Porter, was published in 1908.

Works
Piedmont Valley (1895)
Piedmont Hills (1896)
Landscape (1896)
Piedmont (1896)
Pines: St. Hospice (1897)
The Marne: Charenton (1898)
The Basin: St. Cloud (1898)
Charenton (1898)
Penarth Pier (1898)

References

Further reading
California Art Research, Vol V (1937), Work Projects Administration
The Letters of Arthur Atkins (1908), A. M. Robertson and Bruce Porter
Art in California (1916), Bruce Porter, Porter Garnett, et al.
Artists of the American West, Vol III (1985), Doris Ostrander Dawdy
Artists in California 1786 - 1940 (1989), Edan Milton Hughes

1873 births
1899 deaths
American landscape painters
19th-century American painters
American male painters
Tonalism
English emigrants to the United States
19th-century American male artists